Hindustani may refer to:

 something of, from, or related to Hindustan (another name of India)
 Hindustani language, an Indo-Aryan language, with Hindi and Urdu being its two standard registers
 Fiji Hindi, a variety of Eastern Hindi spoken in Fiji, and is known locally as Hindustani
 Caribbean Hindustani, a variety of Eastern Hindi spoken in the Caribbean
 Hindustani classical music, a major style of Indian classical music
 Hindustani (film) or Indian, a 1996 film starring Kamal Haasan and Manisha Koirala
 Muhammadjan Hindustani, Islamist teacher of Uzbekistan

See also
 Hindustan (disambiguation)
 Hind (disambiguation)
 Hindi (disambiguation)
 South Asian ethnic groups
 Hindustani Lal Sena or Indian Red Army, formed 1939
 Communist Ghadar Party of India, a political group founded in 1970
 Raja Hindustani, a 1996 film starring Aamir Khan and Karishma Kapoor

Language and nationality disambiguation pages